The following lists events that happened during 2020 in New Zealand. One overarching event is the COVID-19 pandemic.

Incumbents

Regal and vice-regal
Head of State – Elizabeth II
Governor-General – Patsy Reddy

Government
Legislature term: 52nd New Zealand Parliament and from November 2020, 53rd New Zealand Parliament.

The Sixth Labour Government, elected in 2017 and October 2020, continues.

Speaker of the House – Trevor Mallard
Prime Minister – Jacinda Ardern
Deputy Prime Minister – Winston Peters until 6 November, then Grant Robertson
Leader of the House – Chris Hipkins
Minister of Finance – Grant Robertson
Minister of Foreign Affairs – Winston Peters until 6 November, then Nanaia Mahuta

Other party leaders in parliament
 National – Simon Bridges until 22 May, then Todd Muller until 14 July, and then Judith Collins (Leader of the Opposition)
 New Zealand First – Winston Peters until 17 October
 Green  –  James Shaw and Marama Davidson
 ACT – David Seymour
 Māori Party – Rawiri Waititi and Debbie Ngarewa-Packer from 17 October

Judiciary
Chief Justice – Helen Winkelmann

Main centre leaders
Mayor of Auckland – Phil Goff
Mayor of Tauranga – Tenby Powell until 20 November, and then Tina Salisbury (acting mayor)
Mayor of Hamilton – Paula Southgate
Mayor of Wellington – Andy Foster
Mayor of Christchurch – Lianne Dalziel
Mayor of Dunedin – Aaron Hawkins

Events

January 
 28 January – Jacinda Ardern announces the general election date to be 19 September.
 29 January – The New Zealand Upgrade Programme is announced.

February 
 3 February – A state of emergency is declared in Milford Sound as rain and flooding hit the region. 
 5 February – Residents of Gore, Mataura and Wyndham are ordered to evacuate as the Mataura River bursts its banks.
 28 February 
 COVID-19 in New Zealand: New Zealand's first case of the coronavirus is confirmed. They had recently returned from Iran via Bali.
 Kiwibank stops issuing and accepting cheques as payment, becoming the first New Zealand bank to do so.

March 
 5 March – COVID-19 in New Zealand: Information of the first human transmission case of the coronavirus within New Zealand is released.
 14 March – COVID-19 in New Zealand: Jacinda Ardern announces new measures to stop the spread of the coronavirus. These measures provide that all people (excluding people who have come from Pacific islands where no cases have been confirmed) who arrive in New Zealand must self-isolate for 14 days. Cruise ships are also banned from docking in New Zealand ports.
 17 March – COVID-19 in New Zealand: A $12.1 billion scheme is announced by the government, due to the economic impact of coronavirus on New Zealand, including $5.1 billion for an income subsidy. This is the biggest peacetime government spend in history.
 19 March – COVID-19 in New Zealand: The Royal New Zealand Returned and Services' Association announces that all Anzac Day services, scheduled for 25 April, will be cancelled and the red poppy collection postponed due to the health risk. This is the first time that Anzac Day services have not been held since 1916.
 21 March – COVID-19 in New Zealand: Ardern announces the COVID-19 alert level system, with New Zealand initially being placed at alert level 2.
 23 March – COVID-19 in New Zealand: New Zealand is placed at alert level 3.
25 March
COVID-19 in New Zealand: A State of National Emergency is declared in response to the COVID-19 pandemic.
COVID-19 in New Zealand: New Zealand is upgraded to alert level 4 at 11:59 pm, and the country enters lockdown for a period of at least four weeks.
26 March – The perpetrator of the 2019 Christchurch mosque shootings pleads guilty to all 51 murder charges, as well as 40 charges of attempted murder and one charge of engaging in a terrorist act laid under the Terrorism Suppression Act 2002.
 29 March – COVID-19 in New Zealand: The first coronavirus-related death in New Zealand occurs, a woman in her 70s from Greymouth.

April 
6 April – COVID-19 in New Zealand: Queen Elizabeth II makes a rare broadcast to the nation and the Commonwealth regarding the COVID-19 pandemic, her fifth televised broadcast outside of her Christmas Message.
 8 April – Dunedin's Baldwin Street reclaims its title as the steepest residential street in the world after Ffordd Pen Llech in Harlech, Wales, took the title in July 2019.
25 April
COVID-19 in New Zealand: New Zealanders paid tribute at private dawn services as public remembrance services are cancelled, the first time since 1916.
Central government announces $40 million funding for mental health service, giving 1.5 million New Zealanders free access to the service, once fully operational.
 27 April – COVID-19 in New Zealand:New Zealand enters alert level 3 for a period of at least two weeks at 11:59 pm, partially lifting the lockdown requirements.

May 

11 May – COVID-19 in New Zealand: Cabinet decides to lower New Zealand's COVID-19 alert level to level two, effective from the 14 May.
13 May
COVID-19 in New Zealand: New Zealand entered COVID-19 alert level two at 11.59pm.
It is reported that New Zealand Police failed to receive clearance from higher officials in central government, the senior police hierarchy or the Privacy Commissioner to use facial recognition software, after a trial was tested using the American firm Clearview AI's system.
14 May – The 2020 Budget is unveiled, including a $50 billion recovery package to offset the impending recession.
 18 May – Statistics NZ announces that New Zealand's population reached five million during March, and estimates the population at 31 March as 5,002,100.
 22 May – Todd Muller and Nikki Kaye are elected leader and deputy leader of the National Party in a leadership election, replacing Simon Bridges and Paula Bennett.

June 
 1 June – The 2020 Queen's Birthday Honours are announced.
 8 June – COVID-19 in New Zealand: New Zealand moves to alert level 1 at 11:59 pm, removing nearly all social restrictions.
19 June – A fatal police shooting in West Auckland leaves a police officer dead and another seriously injured.

July 
 7 July – Hamish Walker, Member of Parliament for Clutha-Southland leaks sensitive information containing private details of COVID-19 patients. On the same day, Michelle Boag, former president of the National Party confesses that she sent the information to Walker. Boag resigns from her position as chief executive of the Auckland Rescue Helicopter Trust.
 9 July – Rio Tinto announces that Tiwai Point smelter is set to close, leaving 1000 people out of employment. 
 14 July
 Todd Muller announces his immediate resignation as the leader of National Party, citing health reasons.
 Judith Collins and Gerry Brownlee are elected new leader and deputy leader of the National Party.

August 
 11 August – COVID-19 in New Zealand: Four new cases of COVID-19 outside of a quarantine facility are reported.
 12 August
 COVID-19 in New Zealand: At noon, Auckland enters alert level 3, while the rest of the country enters alert level 2.
 The dissolution of Parliament, originally set for this day, is delayed until 17 August.
 17 August
 Ardern announces that the 2020 New Zealand general election will be delayed until 17 October.
 The dissolution of Parliament is also delayed, to 6 September.

September 
 4 September – COVID-19 in New Zealand: The first death from COVID-19 since 28 May is reported.
 6 September – The 52nd New Zealand Parliament is dissolved.
 29 September – Two people are charged over the New Zealand First Foundation investigation.

October 
 4 October – A wildfire at Lake Ōhau causes the evacuation of 90 residents. As of 6 October, the fire had burnt 5,300 hectares, of which 1,900 hectares is conservation land.
 17 October – The 2020 general election is held alongside referendums on personal cannabis consumption and euthanasia. Labour wins a majority of the seats in Parliament, continuing the Sixth Labour Government.

November

December 
 9 December – The University of Otago cancels its end-of-year graduation ceremonies after receiving a security threat. 
 26 December – The Tasman region suffers a heavy hail storm, causing millions of dollars in physical and economic damage. 
 27 December – Manukura, a North Island brown kiwi, born entirely with white feathers, dies after deteriorating health following surgery.
 29 December 
A large bushfire in Ahipara leads to local residents being evacuated.
29 December - 3 January 2021 – Riots between inmates and prison guards at Waikeria Prison, causing major fire damage to the complex.
 31 December – The 2021 New Year Honours are announced.

Holidays and observances 
Public holidays in New Zealand in 2020 are as follows:

 1 January – New Year's Day
 2 January – Day after New Year's Day
 6 February – Waitangi Day
 10 April – Good Friday
 12 April – Easter Sunday
 13 April – Easter Monday
 25 April – Anzac Day
 27 April – Anzac Day observed
 1 June – Queen's Birthday
 26 October – Labour Day
 25 December – Christmas Day
 26 December – Boxing Day
 28 December – Boxing Day observed

Sports

Sailing
 The 2020 America's Cup World Series is sailed in Auckland on 17–19 December, and is won by Team New Zealand in Te Rehutai, helmed by Peter Burling

Shooting
Ballinger Belt – 
 David Black (Australia)
 Allan White (Malvern), second, top New Zealander

Winter Youth Olympics

 New Zealand sent a team of 20 competitors across nine sports to the 2020 Winter Youth Olympics, held in Lausanne, Switzerland, on 9–22 January.

Deaths

January
 1 January – Dick Scott, historian and journalist (born 1923).
 7 January – Rob Ronayne, lawyer and jurist, District Court judge (since 2013) (born 1955).
 10 January – Tiny White, equestrianism competitor, judge and administrator (born 1924).
 14 January – Bernard Diederich, author, journalist (Time), and historian, Maria Moors Cabot Prize (1976) (born 1926).
 18 January – Piri Sciascia, Māori leader, kapa haka exponent, and university administrator (Victoria University of Wellington), kaumātua to the governor-general (since 2016) (born 1946).
 22 January – John Kasper, cricketer (Auckland, Natal) (born 1946).
 25 January
 Shirley Murray, hymn writer (born 1931).
 Dame Alison Roxburgh, women's rights advocate and community leader (born 1934).
 26 January – Gordon McLauchlan, author, broadcaster and social historian, GOFTA for television presenter of the year (1987) (born 1931).
 29 January 
 Ruth Butterworth, political studies academic (University of Auckland), president of the Association of University Staff (1990–1991) (born 1934).
 Keith Nelson, association footballer (Hamilton AFC, Mount Wellington, national team) (born 1947).
 31 January
 Tony Ford, lawyer and jurist, judge of the Court of Appeal of Fiji (2005–2007), Chief Justice of Tonga (2006–2010), Employment Court judge (2010–2013) (born 1942).
 Alison Preston-Thomas, netball player (national team) (born 1927).

February
 1 February – Denford McDonald, mechanical engineer and businessman (Todd Motors, Mitsubishi New Zealand) (born 1929).
 2 February – Mike Moore, politician and diplomat, MP (1972–1975, 1978–1999), Minister of Tourism (1984–1987), Minister of Overseas Trade (1984–1990), leader of the Labour Party (1990–1993), Prime Minister (1990), Director-General of the World Trade Organization (1999–2002), ambassador to the United States (2010–2015) (born 1949).
 4 February
 Andrew Brough, Hall of Fame singer, songwriter and guitarist (Straitjacket Fits) (born 1963).
 Peter Hogg, lawyer and legal scholar (Osgoode Hall Law School), Queen's Counsel (since 1980) (born 1939).
 8 February – Lew Mander, organic chemist (University of Adelaide, Australian National University) (born 1939).
 13 February
 Sir Des Britten, restaurateur, radio broadscaster (2ZB), television chef, and Anglican priest, Wellington City Missioner (1994–2011) (born 1939).
 Jimmy Thunder, boxer, Commonwealth Games gold medallist (1986), IBO heavyweight world champion (1994–1995) (born 1966).
 15 February – Alan Henderson, television cameraman and puppeteer (Thingee) (born ).
 16 February – Graeme Allwright, singer and songwriter (born 1926).
 17 February – Terry Lineen, rugby union player (Auckland, national team) (born 1936).
 18 February – James Lobet, aircraft designer (Lobet Ganagobie) (born 1932).
 19 February – Wes Sandle, physicist (University of Otago) (born 1935).
 27 February – Tina Carline, radio announcer (2ZB, 2ZM, 2YA), television continuity announcer and weather presenter (WNTV1, TV One) (born 1948).

March
 2 March – Roger Cooper, paleontologist (GNS Science), Hutton Medal (2017) (born 1939).
 3 March – Kerry Marshall, local politician, Mayor of Richmond (1986–1989), Mayor of Tasman (1989–1998), Mayor of Nelson (2007–2010) (born 1940).
 4 March – Helen Courtney, cartoonist and illustrator (Broadsheet) (born 1952).
 5 March
 Troy Collings, travel executive (born ). (death announced on this date)
 Shirley Cowles, cricketer (Canterbury, national team) (born 1939).
 Jeanette Fitzsimons, politician and environmentalist, co-leader of the Green Party (1995–2009), Alliance list MP (1996–1999), MP for Coromandel (1999–2002), Green list MP (2002–2010) (born 1945).
 11 March – Sir Rob Fenwick, Hall of Fame businessman and environmentalist, leader of the Progressive Green Party (1996–1998), chancellor of St John New Zealand (2006–2008), chair of Antarctica New Zealand (2008–2015) (born 1951).
 21 March – Cindy Beavis, radio broadcaster (Radio New Zealand, Access Radio) (born 1934).
 22 March
 Bob McCullough, cricketer (Wellington) (born 1943).
 Peter Stapleton, musician (The Terminals, Dadamah, Flies Inside The Sun) (born 1954).
 26 March – Colin Graham, cricketer (Otago) (born 1929).
 29 March – Claire Stewart, local politician, New Plymouth District Councillor (1989–1992), Mayor of New Plymouth (1992–2001) (born 1941).

April
 3 April – Eric Verdonk, rower (born 1959)
 6 April – Jock Edwards, cricketer (born 1955)
 8 April – Te Huirangi Waikerepuru, Māori language activist, trade unionist (born 1929)
 11 April – Might and Power, Thoroughbred racehorse (foaled 1993)
 14 April – Dean Parker, screenwriter, journalist, political commentator (born 1947)
 22 April – Dennis Copps, cricket umpire (born 1929)
 23 April – Bruce Allpress, actor (born 1930)
 24 April – Phil Broadhurst, jazz musician, composer, radio presenter (born 1949)

May
 3 May – Geoff Anderson, cricketer (born 1939)
 4 May – Alan Sutherland, rugby union player (born 1944)
 7 May
 Margaret Loutit, microbiologist (born 1929)
 George Simpkin, rugby union coach (born 1943)
 8 May – James Hill, rower (born 1930)
 14 May – Tony Coll, rugby league player, local-body politician (born )
 15 May – Rick Muru, rugby league player (born )
 29 May – Susie Simcock, squash player and administrator (born 1938)

June
 1 June – Giyannedra Prasad, Fijian lawyer and politician (born 1959)
 2 June
 Leslie Kay, electrical engineer (born 1922).
 Lindsay Townsend, rugby union player (born 1934)
 10 June
 Joan Ferner, women's rights advocate (born 1933)
 Murray Hill, seed technologist (born 1939)
 11 June 
 Basil Meeking, Roman Catholic bishop (born 1929)
 Matt Poore, cricketer (born 1930)
 13 June – Krystyna Tomaszyk, writer, social activist (born 1932)
 16 June – Alistair Soper, rugby union player (born 1936)
 17 June – Paul Matete, rugby league player and coach (born 1949)
 18 June - Jim Young, boat builder and designer (born 1925).
 19 June - Matthew Hunt, police officer (born 1991) 
 20 June – Aaron Tokona, musician (born )
 21 June – Dennis Young, rugby union player (born 1930)
 22 June – Stewart Speed, cricketer (born 1942)
 23 June – Mike McCool, rugby union player (born 1951)
 24 June – Toni Waho, Māori language advocate (born )
 28 June
 John Kneebone, farming leader (born 1935)
 Jim Ross, educationalist, public servant (born 1930)

July
 1 July – Bill Black, pilot, live deer capture pioneer (born )
 2 July – Bill Massey, softball player, coach and umpire (born 1936)
 10 July – Genevieve Westcott, journalist and television presenter (born 1955)
 12 July – Kevin Dwyer, cricketer (born 1929)
 14 July  – James Brown, public servant (born 1925)
 20 July – Ross Dallow, police officer, politician (born 1937)
 21 July – Bruce McPhail, rugby union player (born 1937)
 29 July – Andy Haden, rugby union player (born 1950)

August
 2 August – Tony Campbell, biblical scholar (born 1934)
 4 August – Murray Cheater, athlete (born 1947)
 6 August – Lindsay Brown, accountant, university administrator (born )
 8 August – Jean Stewart, swimmer (born 1930)
 9 August – Heta Hingston, 82, jurist (born 1938)
 10 August
 Vinka Lucas, fashion designer and retailer, magazine founder (born 1932)
 Don Martin, musician (born )
 21 August – Sir Bob Elliott, paediatrician (born 1934)
 23 August – Jack Tynan, field hockey player, cricketer (born 1925)
 25 August – Graham Newdick, cricketer (born 1949)
 26 August
 Keri Kaa, writer, educator, Māori language advocate (born 1942)
 Douglas MacDiarmid, artist (born 1922)
 27 August – Ivan Keats, athlete (born 1937)
 28 August – Don Bacon, microbiologist (born 1926)
 31 August – Megan Wraight, landscape architect (born 1961)

September
 2 September – John Shrapnell, journalist, actor, singer (born 1934)
 4 September – Joe Williams, politician, doctor and health researcher (born 1934)
 5 September – David Walter, local-body politician, journalist (born 1939)
 6 September – Sir Vaughan Jones, mathematician (born 1952)
 8 September – Jane Soons, geomorphologist (born 1931)
 13 September
 Kirsty Durward, gymnast (born )
 Dave Halligan, rugby union player (born 1959)
 15 September – Nigel Te Hiko, historian, Ngāti Raukawa leader (born ).
 17 September – Don McGregor, zoologist, science advisor (born 1938)
 24 September – Max Merritt. musician (born 1941)
 25 September – Matt Ratana, police officer (born 1966)
 29 September – John Whittaker, rugby league player (born 1950)
 30 September – Guy Natusch, architect (born 1921)

October
 5 October – John Tanner, rugby union player (born 1927)
 8 October – Jack Sutherland, athlete (born 1927)
 14 October – John Reid, cricketer (born 1928)
 18 October – Eddie Tonks, rugby union administrator (born 1934)
 23 October – David Barnes, sailor (born 1958)

November
 2 November – Trevor Malloch, cricketer (born 1928)
 7 November – Bones Hillman, musician (born 1958)
 21 November – Rufus Rehu, musician (born 1939)
 25 November
 Marion Law, netball player (born 1940)
 Alan Powell, historian  (born 1936)
 30 November – Ross Dykes, cricket player, administrator and referee (born 1945)

December
 4 December – Anand Singh, Fijian politician (born 1948)
 5 December – Des Ferrow, cricketer (born 1933)
 7 December – Malcolm Simpson, cyclist (born 1933)
 8 December – Gerard Stokes, rugby league player and coach (born 1955)
 10 December – Barry Wynks, lawn bowls player (born 1952)
 11 December – James Flynn, political scientist, intelligence researcher, politician (born 1934)
 13 December – Rose Pere, educationalist, conservationist (born 1937)
 16 December – Brian Pickworth, fencer (born 1929)
 17 December – Ed Nichols, alpine skier (born 1923)
 20 December – Arthur Campbell, analytical chemist (born 1925)
 25 December – David Thorns, sociologist (born 1943)
 27 December – Manukura, white North Island brown kiwi (hatched 2011)
 28 December – John Reid, cricketer (born 1956)

References

 
2020s in New Zealand
Years of the 21st century in New Zealand
New Zealand
New Zealand